Antonio Pietro Cortinovis (7 November 1885 – 10 April 1984) - in religious Cecilio Maria da Costa Serina - was an Lombard Roman Catholic professed religious from the Order of Friars Minor Capuchin. He had set his heart on entering the religious life despite his initial reluctance due to him pondering on his unworthiness. This belief manifested in his childhood which motivated him to decide against entering the priesthood. But his religious formation in the order was pushed back due to World War I and he was unable to make his solemn religious profession until the war had concluded.

Cortinovis served as a porter and beggar for the order in their convent in Milan and remained there until his death. He established the Opera San Francesco in 1959 in order to work with the poor and was a foundation that earned the support of the Archbishop of Milan (and future pope) Giovanni Battista Montini.

The beatification process opened in Milan in 1993 and he became titled as a Servant of God. Pope Francis confirmed his heroic virtue and named him as Venerable on 6 March 2018.

Life
Antonio Pietro Cortinovis was born on 7 November 1885 at 5:00pm in Costa Serina in Bergamo as the seventh of nine children to the peasants Lorenzo Cortinovis and Angela Gherardi (who was born to Giacomo in Trafficanti). His parents were married in 1870. The preceding sibling Margherita died just after her birth. Father Pietro Rota baptized him on 8 November in the church of Santi Lorenzo martire e Ambrogio.

From his childhood he had a strong love and devotion to both the Eucharist and the Passion. He had often described his father as being rather reserved and sensitive and received his religious formation from his mother. From age six he began attending confession and he received his Confirmation on 10 August 1892 before making his First Communion on 7 April 1896.

He never desired being an altar server in his childhood and perceived great unworthiness on his part in becoming a priest. This became the reason that he was never to become a priest. But after he did his schooling the idea to enter the religious life as a professed brother came to him and grew over time. In 1899 he entered the Third Order of Saint Francis and later in 1901 confessed to the priest friar Teodosio da Samarate (who came to the town to preach) of his desire to enter the religious life. Teodosio encouraged him and invited him to become a friar. Once - in 1905 - some acquaintances dragged him into a tavern and forced him to drink wine as the group did.

Before he turned 23 he worked as both a shepherd and as a lumberjack. Cortinovis entered the Order of Friars Minor Capuchin on 21 April 1908 after his father (who died not long after in January 1909) accompanied him to the convent in Bergamo. His mother and siblings wept upon his departure. He moved to the Sovere convent on 22 April 1908 before commencing his novitiate under the guidance of Gianfrancesco da Cascina Ferrara. Cortinovis was vested in the religious habit for the first time on 29 July 1908 and assumed the religious name "Cecilio Maria da Costa Serina". He began to fast and scourge himself after this and he later made his simple profession on 2 August 1909. He spent time at the convent in Albino (from 10 August 1909 after his novitiate ended) before he was moved to the convent in Cremona on 17 February 1910. Cortinovis was later relocated to the order's convent in Milan on 29 April 1910.

In Milan he lived in the convent of Viale Piave and tended to the poor of the area and acted as the sacristan from November 1914 until 1921. In 1914 he contracted meningitis which almost killed him. But he was healed on 18 April 1914 (when it seemed he was about to die) after his confrere Girolamo da Lomazzo turned to the intercession of Innocenzo da Berzo for a miracle.

In July 1916 he was sent to the 5th Alpine Regiment in Tirano to reinforce the Stelvio Battalion on Mount Nero and regretted the fact that he was not allowed to wear his religious habit. But heart issues prompted a doctor's examination in November 1916 and he was discharged. Cortinovis made his solemn religious profession on 2 February 1918 and on 16 September 1921 was appointed as the porter for the convent.

But he dreamed of working in the missions in either Brazil or Africa and he wanted to spend his life helping Venerable Daniele da Samarate with the lepers in Brazil. At dawn on 5 July 1922 he was in his cell when he saw a bright light and experienced a vision.

Cortinovis later established the Opera San Francesco in order to tend and minister to poor people. This project and its work received support from the Archbishop of Milan (and future pope) Giovanni Battista Montini. Cortinovis was also a close friend to the Bishop of Cesena Lino Esterino Garavaglia. In 1969 the Milanese authorities awarded him a silver medal for his work with the poor while the Lombard province granted him a gold medal for the same reason in 1970. His awards both made it into the press due to his reputation.

From August 1979 he began suffering from cardiac pains and often had a series of breathing difficulties due to tract complications. His superiors decided his work with the Opera San Francesco had to end so as for him to recover. Cortinovis did not wish to do this but relented with obedience. From 1981 he kept moving from Milan to the convent's hospital in Bergamo for treatment.

He died at 9:15pm on 10 April 1984 in Bergamo with a smile on his face. The requiem was celebrated at the Bergamo convent before the solemn funeral Mass was celebrated at the Milanese convent where he had lived for most of his life. His remains were buried at Musocco but were later exhumed and relocated to the church of the Sacred Heart on 31 January 1989. His remains lie in the chapel of that church close to the porter's lodge.

Beatfication process
The beatification process opened under Pope John Paul II on 1 July 1993 after the Congregation for the Causes of Saints titled Cortinovis as a Servant of God and issued the "nihil obstat" (no objections to the cause) edict that initiated the cause. Cardinal Carlo Maria Martini oversaw the diocesan investigation into the late friar's life and virtues from 27 September 1993 until 10 April 1995. The C.C.S. validated the diocesan process in Rome on 22 March 1996 and later received the Positio dossier two decades later for assessment.

Theologians assessed and approved the contents of the Positio in their meeting held on 6 February 2018. Pope Francis confirmed his heroic virtue and named him as Venerable on 6 March 2018.

The current postulator for the cause is the Capuchin friar Carlo Calloni.

References

External links
 Hagiography Circle

1885 births
1984 deaths
19th-century Italian people
19th-century venerated Christians
20th-century Italian people
Capuchins
Italian military personnel of World War I
Italian venerated Catholics
Members of the Third Order of Saint Francis
Religious leaders from Bergamo
Venerated Catholics by Pope Francis